This is a list of icebreakers and other special icebreaking vessels (except cargo ships and tankers) capable of operating independently in ice-covered waters. Ships known to be in service are presented in bold.

Argentina 
 (1954–1982)
 (1978–2007, 2017–)
 (1980–1989; sank in Antarctica)
A new icebreaking vessel is planned to enter service in the late 2020s.

Australia 
 Aurora Australis (1990–2020; decommissioned)
 Nuyina (2021–)

Austria 
 Eisvogel (1955–)
 Röthelstein (1995–)

Azerbaijan 
 Kapitan A. Radzhabov (1992–1999; laid up)

Canada

Canadian Coast Guard 

  (1876–1890; sold)
  (1888–1935; broken up)
  (1909–1914; sold to Russia)
  (1916; 1923–1937; ex-J.D. Hazen, ex-Mikula Seleaninovich; broken up)
  (1929–1967; broken up)
  (1930–1979; broken up)
  (1939–1978; museum ship)
  (1952–1983; broken up)
  (1954–1987; broken up)
  (1959–1984; museum ship)
  (1960–1991; broken up)
  (1969–1993; sold to Chile)
  (1969–)
  (1970–)
 Pierre Radisson class
  (1977–)
  (1979–)
  (1982–)
  (1987–)
 Samuel Risley class
  (1985–)
  (1986–)
 Martha L. Black class
  (1986–)
  (1986–)
  (1986–)
  (1986–)
  (1987–)
  (1987–)
  (1991–)
 Interim icebreakers
  (2018–; ex-Vidar Viking)
  (2020–; ex-Balder Viking)
  (2022–; ex-Tor Viking)
  (2021–; undergoing refit; ex-Mangystau-2)
 New icebreakers and icebreaking vessels planned as part of the National Shipbuilding Strategy
 six medium-sized "program icebreakers"
 two modified Harry DeWolf-class offshore patrol vessels
 sixteen multi-purpose vessels
 two polar icebreakers based on the proposed  design

Royal Canadian Navy 
  (1954–1961; transferred to Coast Guard)
 Harry DeWolf-class offshore patrol vessel 
 (2021–)
 (2022– (planned); delivered and performing post-acceptance sea trials)
 (under construction)
 (under construction)
 (under construction)
 (ordered)

Commercial 
 Canmar Kigoriak (1979–2003; sold to Russia)
 Robert LeMeur (1982–1997; sold to China)
 Terry Fox (1983–1991; leased and later sold to the Canadian Coast Guard)
 Arctic Kalvik (1983–2003; sold to Russia)
 Ikaluk (1983–1998; Canmar Ikaluk since 1995; sold to Russia)
 Miscaroo (1983–1998; Canmar Miscaroo since 1995; sold to Russia)
 Arctic Ivik (1985–1997; sold and later converted to survey vessel Geco Snapper)
 Polar S (2000–; ex-Njord, ex-Polar Star; laid up in Canary Islands due to receivership of Polar Star Expeditions in 2011)
 Polar Prince (2000–; ex-Sir Humphrey Gilbert)
 Arcticaborg (2018–2019)

China

Polar Research Institute of China 
 Xuě Lóng (雪龙, "Snow Dragon") (1993–)
 Xuě Lóng 2 (雪龙2, "Snow Dragon 2") (2019–)

People's Liberation Army Navy 
 Type 071 icebreaker
 Haibing 721 (海冰721, "Sea Ice 721") (1971–; in reserve)
 Haibing 722 (海冰722, "Sea Ice 722") (1973–2013; decommissioned)
 Haibing 519 (海冰519, "Sea Ice 519") (1989–)
 Type 210 icebreaker
 Haibing 723 (海冰723, "Sea Ice 723") (1982–)
 Type 272 icebreaker
 Haibing 722 (海冰722, "Sea Ice 722") (2016–)
 Haibing 723 (海冰723, "Sea Ice 723") (2016–)

Sun Yat-sen University 
 Zhong Shan Da Xue Ji Di (2021–; ex-Beijing Ocean Leader, ex-Ikaluk, ex-Smit Sibu, ex-Canmar Ikaluk)

Commercial 
 Bin Hai 293 (滨海293, "Coastal 293") (1997–2016; ex-Robert LeMeur; broken up)
 Beijing Ocean Leader (2018–2021; ex-Ikaluk, ex-Smit Sibu, ex-Canmar Ikaluk; sold to Sun Yat-sen University)

Chile 
 Piloto Pardo (1959–1997; sold to private buyer)
 Almirante Óscar Viel (1995–2019; ex-Norman McLeod Rogers; decommissioned and later sunk as target)
 Almirante Viel (2024– (planned); under construction)

Denmark 

 Bryderen (1884–1947; sold to Poland; broken up in 1960)
 Isbjørn (1923–1965)
 Lillebjørn (1926–1968)
 Storebjørn (1931–1974; broken up)
 Elbjørn (1954–1996; used as a restaurant ship until sold for scrap in 2019)
 Danbjørn (1965–2013; laid up and listed for sale)
 Isbjørn (1966–2013; laid up and listed for sale)
 Thorbjørn (1980–2015; sold to private company)

Estonia

Estonian Maritime Museum
 Suur Tõll (1922–1940; museum ship in Tallinn since 1987)

Estonian Maritime Administration
 Tarmo (1993–; purchased from Finland)
 EVA 316 (1995–; ex-Lonna; purchased from Finland)

Port of Tallinn
 Karu (1988–2002; ex-Karhu, ex-Kapitan Chubakov; purchased from Finland and sold to Russia)
 Botnica (2012–; purchased from Finland)

Finland

State-owned icebreakers

Steam-powered 

 Murtaja (1890–1958; broken up)
 Sampo (1898–1960; broken up)
 Apu (1899–1959; broken up)
 Tarmo (1907–1970; museum ship in Kotka since 1992)
 Wäinämöinen (1918–1922; handed over to Estonia)
 Ilmarinen (1918–1922; handed over to the Soviet Union)
 Voima (1924–1945; handed over to the Soviet Union)
 Jääkarhu (1926–1945; handed over to the Soviet Union)

Diesel-electric 

 Sisu (1939–1974; as Louhi in the Finnish Navy until 1986; broken up)
 Voima (1954–)
 Karhu class
 Karhu (1958–1986; sold to the Soviet Union)
 Murtaja (1959–1986; broken up)
 Sampo (1960–1987; today owned by the city of Kemi and used for tourist cruises)
 Tarmo class
 Tarmo (1963–1993; sold to Estonia)
 Varma (1968–1994; sold to Latvia)
 Apu (1970–2006; sold to Russia)
 Hanse (1966–1998; sold to Greece; wrecked off Tunisia)
 Urho class
 Urho (1975–)
 Sisu (1976–)
 Otso class
 Otso (1986–)
 Kontio (1987–)
 Multipurpose icebreakers
 Fennica (1993–)
 Nordica (1994–)
 Botnica (1998–2012; sold to Estonia)
 Polaris (2016–)

Finnish Navy 

 Louhi (1975–1986; ex-Sisu; broken up)
 Louhi (2011–)

Alfons Håkans 

 Zeus of Finland (1995–; ex-Zeus)
 Thetis (2016–; ex-Maersk Shipper, ex-Maersk Placentia)
 Hermes (2016–; ex-Drive Mahone, ex-Maersk Mahone, ex-Maersk Server; laid up)

France

French Navy 
 L'Astrolabe (2017–)

Compagnie du Ponant 
 Le Commandant Charcot (2021–)

Other 
 L'Astrolabe (1988–2017; decommissioned)

Germany 

 Elbe (1911–??; museum ship)
 Hindenburg (1916–1918; sunk by mine)
 Stettin (1933–1981; museum ship)
 Wal (1938–1990; museum ship)
 Castor (1941–1945; sunk by mine but later raised by the Soviet Union)
 Eisvogel (1942–1945; handed over to the Soviet Union)
 Eisbär (1942–1946; handed over to the Soviet Union)
 Pollux (1943–1945; sunk by mine)
 Eisvogel class
 Eisvogel (1961–2006; sold)
 Eisbär (1961–1997; sold)
 Stephan Jantzen (1967–2005; museum ship)
 Polarstern (1982–)
 Mellum (1983–)
 Neuwerk (1997–)
 Arkona (2004–)

Italy 
 Laura Bassi (2019–)

Japan

Imperial Japanese Navy 
Ōtomari (1921–1945)

Japan Maritime Self-Defense Force 
Fuji (AGB-5001) (1965–1985; museum ship)
Shirase (AGB-5002) (1981–2008; sold to Weathernews)
Shirase (AGB-5003) (2008–)

Japan Coast Guard 
Sōya (PL107) (1938–1978; museum ship)
Sōya (PHL01) (1978–)
Teshio (PM 15) (1995–)

Kazakhstan 
The following icebreaking supply ships are operating or have operated in the Kazakh Caspian Sea oil fields:
 Arcticaborg (1998–2018; sold to Canada)
 Antarcticaborg (1998–2019; sold to Russia)
 Tulpar (2002–)
 Mangystau-1 (2010–)
 Mangystau-2 (2010–2020; transferred to Turkmenian flag)
 Mangystau-3 (2011–)
 Mangystau-4 (2011–)
 Mangystau-5 (2011–)

Latvia 
Krišjānis Valdemārs (1925–1941; sunk)
Varma (1994–)
Foros (2015–)

Netherlands

Greenpeace
 Arctic Sunrise (1995–)

Norway 
 NoCGV Svalbard (2001–)
 Kronprins Haakon (2018–)

Poland 
Kuna (1884–; oldest in service river icebreaker in the world)
 Perkun (1963–1993; broken up)

Russia

Icebreakers 
The following lists include icebreakers owned and/or operated by either governmental or commercial entities.

Nuclear-powered icebreakers 

 Lenin (1959–1989; museum ship in Murmansk)
 Arktika class
 Arktika (1975–2008; decommissioned)
 Sibir (1977–1992; decommissioned)
 Rossiya (1985–2013; decommissioned)
 Sovetskiy Soyuz (1990–2014; decommissioned)
 Yamal (1992–)
 50 Let Pobedy (2007–)
 Taymyr class
 Taymyr (1989–)
 Vaygach (1990–)
 Project 22220
 Arktika (2020–)
 Sibir (2021–)
 Ural (2022–) 
 Yakutiya (2024– (planned); under construction)
 Chukotka (2026– (planned); under construction)
 Two additional Project 22220 icebreakers on order
 Project 10510
 Rossiya (2027– (planned); under construction)
 Two additional Project 10510 icebreakers planned

Diesel-powered icebreakers  

 Wind class
 Severny Veter (1944–1951; ex-USCGC Staten Island; returned to the United States)
 Severniy Polyus (1945–1951; ex-USS Westwind; returned to the United States)
 Admiral Makarov (1945–1949; ex-USCGC Southwind; returned to the United States)
 Kapitan Belousov class
 Kapitan Belousov (1954–1991; sold to Ukraine)
 Kapitan Voronin (1955–1996; broken up)
 Kapitan Melekhov (1956–1994; broken up)
 Moskva class
 Moskva (1959–1998; broken up)
 Leningrad (1960–1993; broken up)
 Kiev (1965–1993; broken up)
 Murmansk (1968–1995; broken up)
 Vladivostok (1969–1997; broken up)
 Project 97 (including variants)
 Dobronya Nikitich (1960–1998)
 Purga (1961–2012)
 Vasiliy Pronchishchev (1961–1989; ex-Ledokol-1; broken up)
 Anafasy Nikitin (1962–1995; ex-Ledokol-2; broken up)
 Khariton Laptev (1962–1996; ex-Ledokol-3; broken up)
 Vyuga (1962–1991)
 Vasiliy Poyarkov (1963–1988; ex-Ledokol-4; broken up)
 Yerofey Khabarov (1963–1993; ex-Ledokol-5; broken up)
 Ivan Kruzenstern (1964–; ex-Ledokol-6)
 Vladimir Rusanov (1964–1988; ex-Ledokol-7; broken up)
 Semyon Chelyuskin (1965–1988; ex-Ledokol-8; sold to Vietnam; broken up)
 Ilya Muromets (1965–1993)
 Yuriy Lisyanskiy (1965–; ex-Ledokol-9)
 Buran (1966–)
 Fyodor Litke (1970–2013; broken up)
 Ivan Moskvitin (1971–1997; broken up)
 Semyon Dezhnev (1971–)
 Ermak class
 Ermak (1974–2021; to be broken up)
 Admiral Makarov (1975–)
 Krasin (1976–)
 Kapitan M. Izmaylov class
 Kapitan M. Izmaylov (1976–)
 Kapitan Kosolapov (1976–)
 Kapitan A. Radzhabov (1976–1992; transferred to Azerbaijan)
 Kapitan Sorokin class
 Kapitan Sorokin (1977–; fitted with Thyssen-Waas bow in 1991)
 Kapitan Nikolaev (1978–; rebuilt in 1990)
 Kapitan Dranitsyn (1980–)
 Kapitan Khlebnikov (1981–)
 Kapitan Chechkin class
 Kapitan Chechkin (1977–)
 Kapitan Plakhin (1977–)
 Kapitan Chadaev (1978–)
 Kapitan Krutov (1978–)
 Kapitan Bukaev (1978–)
 Kapitan Zarubin (1978–)
 Mudyug class
 Mudyug (1982–; fitted with Thyssen-Waas bow in 1986)
 Magadan (1982–)
 Dikson (1983–)
 Kapitan Evdokimov class
 Kapitan Evdokimov (1983–)
 Kapitan Babichev (1983–)
 Kapitan Chudinov (1983–)
 Kapitan Borodkin (1983–)
 Avraamiy Zavenyagin (1984–)
 Kapitan Mecaik (1984–)
 Kapitan Deminov (1984–)
 Kapitan Moshkin (1986–)
 Tor (2000–; purchased from Sweden)
 Karu (2002–2020; ex-Karhu, ex-Kapitan Chubakov; purchased from Estonia; broken up)
 Dudinka (2006–; ex-Apu; purchased from Finland)
 Project 21900
 Moskva (2008–)
 Sankt-Peterburg (2009–)
 Baltika (2014–)
 Project MPSV06
 Beringov Proliv (2015–)
 Murman (2015–)
 Kerchenskiy Proliv (under construction)
 Project 21900M
 Vladivostok (2015–)
 Murmansk (2015–)
 Novorossiysk (2016–)
 Ob (2019–)
 Georgiy Sedov (2019–; ex-Antarcticaborg; purchased from Kazakhstan)
 Viktor Chernomyrdin (2020–)
 Project 21900M2
 Unnamed Project 21900M2 icebreaker (2023– (planned); under construction)
 Unnamed Project 21900M2 icebreaker (2028– (planned); under construction)
 Unnamed IBSV02 type icebreaking multipurpose salvage vessel (2024– (planned); under construction)
 Project 23620
 Two unnamed Project 23620 icebreakers (2024– (planned); ordered)
 Project MPSV06M
 Pevek (2024– (planned); under construction)
 Unnamed Project MPSV06M type salvage vessel (2024– (planned))

Steam-powered icebreakers 

 Pilot (1864–1890; broken up?)
 Ledokol 1 (1890–1915; later converted to a gunboat)
 Ledokol 2 (1895–1923; hander over to Latvia)
 Saratovskiy Ledokol (1895–1968; sunk)
 Nadeshnyy (1897–1924; later converted to a gunboat)
 Yermak (1899–1963; broken up)
 Gaydamak (1898–1930; broken up)
 Ledokol 3 (1899–1923; broken up)
 Ledokol IV (1907–1942; sunk by Germans)
 A. Sibiryakov (1909–1942; sunk by Germans)
 Vaygach (1909–1918; sank in 1918)
 Taymyr (1909–1950s?; broken up)
 Silatch (1910–1918, 1922–late 1950s; broken up)
 Malygin (1912–1940; sunk in 1940)
 Volynets (1914–1918, 1940–1985; ex-Tsar' Mikhail Fyodorovich, ex-Wäinämöinen, ex-Suur Tõll; sold to Estonia in 1987)
 Fyodor Litke (1914–1958; ex-CGC Earl Grey; broken up)

 Georgiy Sedov (1915–1967; ex-Beothic (1909–1915); broken up)
 Sadko (1915–1941; ex-Lintrose (1912–1915); sank in 1941)
 Mikula Seleaninovich (1916–1918)
 Ledokol V (1916–1941; sank in 1941)
 Ledokol VI (1916–1961; broken up)
 Ledokol VII (1916–1954; broken up)
 Ledokol VIII (1917–1961; broken up)
 Ledokol IX (1917–1932; sank in White Sea)
 Krasin (1917–1971; extensively rebuilt in 1953–1960, now a museum ship in St. Petersburg)
 Lenin (1917–1968; broken up)
 Stepan Makarov (1917–1941; sunk)
 Toros (1929–1964)
 Sibir (1938–1973; ex-I. Stalin (−1961); broken up)
 Admiral Lazarev (1938–1967; ex-L. Kaganovich (−1951); broken up)
 Admiral Makarov (1941–1967; ex-V. Molotov (−1956); broken up)
 A. Mikoyan (1941–1968; broken up)
 Malygin (1945–1970; ex-Voima; broken up)
 Sibiryakov (1945–1972; ex-Jääkarhu; broken up)
 Alyosha Popovich (1945–1970; ex-Eisvogel; decommissioned and abandoned off Russky Island)
 Ilya Muromets (1946–1979; ex-Eisbär; broken up in 1981)
 Peresvet (1951–1980; ex-Castor; decommissioned and abandoned off Reyneke Island)

Other icebreaking vessels

Offshore vessels 

The following are Russian-owned, -operated and/or -flagged icebreaking anchor handling tug supply vessels, platform supply vessels, standby vessels etc. engaged primarily in offshore oil and gas projects:

 Ikaluk (1998–2018; ex-Ikaluk; ex-Canmar Ikaluk; ex-Smit Sibu; sold to China)
 Smit Sakhalin (1998–2017; ex-Miscaroo; ex-Canmar Miscaroo; broken up)
 Kigoriak (2003–2022; ex-Canmar Kigoriak, ex-Kigoria, ex-Talagy; broken up)
 Vladimir Ignatyuk (2003–; ex-Arctic Kalvik)
 SCF Sakhalin (2005–)
 SCF Enterprise (2006–; ex-Pacific Enterprise)
 SCF Endeavour (2006–; ex-Pacific Endeavour)
 SCF Endurance (2006–; ex-Pacific Endurance)
 Polar Pevek (2006–2022)
 Hermes (2006–; ex-Yury Topchev)
 Antey (2006–; ex-Vladislav Strizhov)
 Toboy (2008–)
 Varandey (2008–)
 Vidar Viking (2012–2016; charter under Russian flag)
 Vitus Bering (2012–)
 Aleksey Chirikov (2013–)
 Aleut (2015–)
 Pomor (2016–)
 Normann (2016–)
 Gennadiy Nevelskoy (2017–)
 Stepan Makarov (2017–)
 Fedor Ushakov (2017–)
 Yevgeny Primakov (2018–)
 Aleksandr Sannikov (2018–)
 Andrey Vilkitsky (2018–)
 Nabil (2022– (planned); not delivered due to sanctions)
 Katerina Velikaya (under construction)
 Svyataya Mariya (under construction)
 Aleksandr Nevskiy (under construction)
 Vladimir Monomakh (under construction)

In addition, the following shallow-draught icebreaking offshore vessels operate in the Russian sector of the Caspian Sea oil fields:

 Arctic (2012–)
 Bumi Uray (2015–)
 Bumi Pokachi (2015–)
 Bumi Naryan-Mar (2015–)
 Antarctic (2017–)
 Polar (2021–)
 Polus (2021–)

Patrol and naval vessels 

The following vessels are or have been in service with the Russian Navy and its predecessors:

 Project 97 variants
 Sadko (1968–2022; sunk as target)
 Peresvet (1970–2011; broken up)
 Ivan Susanin class (Project 97P)
 Ivan Susanin (1973–)
 Aysberg (1974–2006; broken up)
 Ruslan (1975–)
 Anadyr (1976–2019; ex-Dnepr; ex-Imeni XXV syezda KPSS; broken up)
 Dunay (1977–2017; broken up)
 Neva (1978–)
 Volga (1980–)
 Murmansk (1981–2013; ex-Imeni XXVI syezda KPSS; ex-Irtysh; broken up)
 Ilya Muromets (2017–)
 Evpatiy Kolovrat (2022– (planned); under construction)
 Project 23550
 Ivan Papanin (2023– (planned); under construction)
 Nikolay Zubov (2024– (planned); under construction)
 Purga (2024– (planned); under construction)
 Fourth unnamed vessel (ordered)

Research and survey vessels 

 Project 97 variants
 Pyotr Pakhtusov (1966–1998; ex-Mendeleev; ex-Ledokol-10; broken up)
 Georgiy Sedov (1967–1992; broken up)
 Vladimir Kavrayskiy (1969–2012; used as stationary floating barracks PKZ-86)
 Otto Schmidt (1979–1991; broken up)
 Mikhail Somov (1975–)
 Akademik Fedorov (1987–)
 Akademik Tryoshnikov (2012–)

South Africa 
 S. A. Agulhas (1977–)
 S. A. Agulhas II (2012–)

South Korea
 Araon (2009–)

Soviet Union 
 See Russia

Spain 
 Hesperides (1991–)

Sweden

Swedish Maritime Administration 

 Sankt Erik (1915–1977; ex-Isbrytaren II (−1959); museum ship since 1977)
 Atle (1926–1967; ex-Statsisbrytaren (−1931); broken up)
 Ymer (1933–1977; broken up)
 Thule (1953–1998; broken up)
 Oden (1957–1988; broken up)
 Tor (1964–2000; sold to Russia)
 Njord (1969–2000; sold and renamed Polar Star)
 Ale (1973–)
 Atle class
 Atle (1974–)
 Frej (1975–)
 Ymer (1977–)
 Oden (1988–)
 First of the new planned icebreakers to enter service in 2027

Trans Viking Icebreaking & Offshore 
Three icebreaking anchor handling tug supply vessels were chartered by the Swedish Maritime Administration for escort icebreaking duties in the Baltic Sea until 2015.
 Tor Viking II (2000–2015; as Tor Viking under Norwegian flag until 2003)
 Balder Viking (2000–2015)
 Vidar Viking (2001–2012; contract ended prematurely)

Turkmenistan 
 Mangystau-2 (2020–2021; sold to Canada)

Ukraine 
Kapitan Belousov (1991–)
Noosfera (2021–; ex-James Clark Ross; purchased from United Kingdom)

United Kingdom 

  (1990–2008; broken up)
  (1991–2021; sold to Ukraine)
  (1995–2019; sold to Italy)
  (2011–)
  (2020–)

United States

United States Coast Guard 

 USCGC Mackinaw (WAGB-83) (1944–2006; museum ship)
 Wind class
 USCGC Staten Island (WAGB-278) (1944–1974; ex-Severny Veter; ex-Northwind; broken up)
 USCGC Eastwind (WAGB-279) (1944–1968; broken up in 1976–1977)
 USCGC Southwind (WAGB-280) (1944–1974; ex-Admiral Makarov; ex-Atka; broken up in 1976)
 USCGC Westwind (WAGB-281) (1944–1988; ex-Severniy Polyus; broken up)
 USCGC Northwind (WAGB-282) (1945–1989; broken up in 1999)
 USCGC Burton Island (WAGB-283) (1946–1978; broken up in 1982)
 USCGC Edisto (WAGB-284) (1947–1974; broken up in 1980)
 USCGC Glacier (WAGB-4) (1955–1987; broken up in 2012)
 Polar class
 USCGC Polar Star (WAGB-10) (1977–2006, 2013–)
 USCGC Polar Sea (WAGB-11) (1978–2010; inactive)
 USCGC Healy (WAGB-20) (2000–)
 USCGC Mackinaw (WLBB-30) (2006–)
 Polar Security Cutters
 USCGC Polar Sentinel (2025– (planned); ordered)
 Up to two additional Polar Security Cutter are expected to enter service in the late 2020s.

National Science Foundation 
Nathaniel B. Palmer (1992–)
Laurence M. Gould (1997–)
Sikuliaq (2014–)

Edison Chouest Offshore 
 Aiviq (2012–)

References

Icebreaker

es:Rompehielos#Algunos rompehielos